The Mark 13 guided missile launching system (GMLS) is a single-arm missile launcher designed for use on frigates and other military vessels. Because of its distinctive single-armed design, the Mark 13 is often referred to as the "one-armed bandit".

The Mark 13 is equipped to fire the RIM-66 Standard, RGM-84 Harpoon, and RIM-24 Tartar missiles for anti-air and anti-ship defense, and is capable of firing the Standard at a rate of one every eight seconds. Its 40-round magazine consists of two concentric rings of vertically stored missiles, 24 in the outer ring and 16 in the inner. Total capacity was reduced by 1 due to a requirement to carry a Guided Missile Training Round (GMTR) in order to test system functionality. In case of a fire, the system is equipped with magazine sprinkling, CO2 suppression and booster suppression. It is also equipped with a dud jettison function to eject a round overboard if it fails to fire.

Usage
In the United States Navy, the Mark 13 launcher was most typically employed as part of the Mark 74 Guided Missile Launch System, or the Mark 92 Fire Control System. Though the launcher was original armament on U.S. Navy Perry-class frigates (and their derivatives), in order to save costs on an obsolete system, by 2004 all active U.S. Navy vessels have had the system removed. It was also fitted on the French Cassard-class frigates, as well as the two Mitscher-class destroyers converted to DDGs, the last ten American Charles F. Adams-class destroyers, the American s, the German s and Australian s and s, and Dutch s and s, and Italian s.

Due to the end of the US Navy's support of the Mark 13 missile launcher, support for the systems in Taiwanese service was taken up by the National Chung-Shan Institute of Science and Technology. The same approach was taken for the Mark 13’s SM-1.

Variations
The Mark 22 guided missile launching system (GMLS) is a variation of the Mark 13 launcher which has only the inner 16 round storage ring of the Mark 13 launcher. It was deployed on US-designed, Baleares-class Spanish frigates. and US Navy Brooke class frigates. Another major difference is that on the Mark 22 the magazine is non-rotating. The launcher rotates over the desired missile and it is then hoisted onto the rail. On the Mark 13 the magazine rotates under the launcher.

Gallery

See also

List of United States Navy Guided Missile Launching Systems
Tartar Guided Missile Fire Control System
M-11 Shtorm Russian counterpart

References

External links
NAVEDTRA 14909 Gunner’s Mate 3 & 2 – Chapters 7 through 8 (1996) via alternatewars.com
FAS Mk 13 GMLS

Naval weapons of the United States
Naval guided missile launch systems of the United States
Military equipment introduced in the 1960s